Butler Glacier is a broad glacier draining the north side of Edward VII Peninsula in the vicinity of Clark Peak, and flowing generally northeastward through the Alexandra Mountains to its terminus in Sulzberger Bay. It was mapped from surveys by the United States Geological Survey and from U.S. Navy air photos (1959–65), and named by the Advisory Committee on Antarctic Names for Lieutenant F.M. Butler, U.S. Navy, expedition navigator in charge of all navigation watch sections on  during the exploration of this area in January 1962.

See also
 List of glaciers in the Antarctic
 Glaciology

References
 

Glaciers of King Edward VII Land